Archibald Gordon may refer to:

Archibald Gordon (British Army officer) (1812–1886), Scottish inspector-general of hospitals
Ronald Gordon (Archibald Ronald McDonald Gordon, 1927–2015), British Anglican bishop
Archibald Gordon, 5th Marquess of Aberdeen and Temair (1913–1984), Scottish writer, broadcaster and peer
Archibald Gordon (missionary) (1882–1967), who served in India through the Canadian Baptist Ministries
Archibald Alexander Gordon (1867–1949), Scottish soldier

See also